Eliseo Diego (July 2, 1920 – March 1, 1994) was a Cuban poet praised for his lyric poetry, and short stories. He was born in Havana and died in Mexico City. Diego, the father of writer Eliseo Alberto, won the Mexican Juan Rulfo Prize in 1993.

He published his first collection of poetry, En las Oscuras Manos del Olvido ("In the Dark Hands of Forgetting"), at 22. He was part of the Cuban literary group Origines in the 1950s. Praised as a lyric poet and writer of short stories, he was also a translator of fairy tales, and some of his poems were directly based on fairy tales. For Diego, fairy tales were also instrumental in the literacy education of the Cuban population after the 1959 Cuban Revolution.

References

External links
 Finding aid for the Eliseo Diego Papers

20th-century Cuban poets
Cuban poets
Cuban male poets
1920 births
1994 deaths
Cuban translators
20th-century male writers
20th-century translators
Cuban expatriates in Mexico